The 2021 Portuguese motorcycle Grand Prix (officially known as the Grande Prémio 888 de Portugal) was the third round of the 2021 Grand Prix motorcycle racing season. It was held at the Algarve International Circuit in Portimão on 18 April 2021.

Background

Impact of the COVID-19 pandemic 

On 22 January 2021 Dorna announced a significant update of the provisional calendar following the postponement of the Argentine and American Grands Prix, originally scheduled as the second and third rounds of the championship (on 11 and 18 April respectively) due to the COVID-19 situation in both countries, with potential rescheduling for the last quarter of 2021. The Portuguese Grand Prix at the Algarve was entered as a reserve Grand Prix, along with the Indonesian Grand Prix and the Russian Grand Prix (later removed from the list). On the same day Dorna announced an agreement with the organizers of the Portuguese Grand Prix to hold the race on the Algarve circuit as the third stage of the 2021 championship (the first of the season in Europe) on 18 April. Portugal had returned to the championship as a substitute race the previous year, when the last round of the 2020 championship was held.

MotoGP Championship standings before the race 
After the Doha Grand Prix, Johann Zarco is the new leader of the rider standings at 40 points, followed by the Monster Energy Yamaha riders Fabio Quartararo and Maverick Viñales, winners of the first two races of the season, four points behind; followed by Francesco Bagnaia and Álex Rins, respectively fourteen and seventeen points behind Zarco.

In the constructors' classification, Yamaha leads with 50 points, 10 more than Ducati. Suzuki is third at 26 points, with Aprilia fourth at 15 points; KTM and Honda close at 11 points.

In the team championship standings, Monster Energy Yamaha is first with 72 points. Pramac Racing is second at 57 points, with Team Suzuki Ecstar and Ducati Lenovo Team following at 45 and 40 points respectively. Repsol Honda Team is fifth with 18 points.

Moto2 Championship riders' standings before the race 
Sam Lowes leads the intermediate class with 50 points, followed by Remy Gardner at 40 points. Raúl Fernández is third with 26 points, one more than Marco Bezzecchi and five more than Fabio Di Giannantonio.

Moto3 Championship riders' standings before the race 
After his victory in the Doha Grand Prix, Pedro Acosta moved up to the top of the standings with 45 points, followed by Darryn Binder on 36 points and Jaume Masiá on 32 points. Fourth and fifth Niccolò Antonelli and Izan Guevara respectively at 26 and 19 points.

MotoGP participants 
Marc Márquez returns as Honda's starter rider after the incident in the 2020 Spanish Grand Prix, which is valid as the first race of the 2020 championship.

Moto2 participants 
 Miquel Pons replace Simone Corsi because of an injury. 
 Fraser Rogers replace Barry Baltus because of fractured left wrist injury.

Moto3 participants 
The riders and teams were the same as the season entry list with no additional stand-in riders for the race.

Free practice

MotoGP 
Maverick Viñales was fastest in the first session, followed by Álex Rins and Marc Márquez. In the second session, Francesco Bagnaia preceded Fabio Quartararo and Joan Mir. In the third session, Quartararo finished at the top of the standings ahead of Franco Morbidelli and Bagnaia.

Combined Free Practice 1-2-3 
The top ten riders (written in bold) qualified in Q2.

The fastest personal time of the riders are written in bold type.

Qualifying

MotoGP

Race

MotoGP

 Jorge Martín suffered hand & foot fractures in a crash during practice and withdrew from the event.

Moto2

Moto3

Championship standings after the race
Below are the standings for the top five riders, constructors, and teams after the round.

MotoGP

Riders' Championship standings

Constructors' Championship standings

Teams' Championship standings

Moto2

Riders' Championship standings

Constructors' Championship standings

Teams' Championship standings

Moto3

Riders' Championship standings

Constructors' Championship standings

Teams' Championship standings

Notes

References

External links

Portuguese
Motorcycle Grand Prix
Motorcycle Grand Prix
Portuguese motorcycle Grand Prix